Vadim Yaroshchuk (born April 2, 1966) is a former butterfly and medley swimmer from the Soviet Union. He won two bronze medals at the 1988 Summer Olympics in Seoul, South Korea. He did so as a member of the 4×100 medley relay, and in the 200m individual medley.

References
 databaseOlympics

1966 births
Living people
Soviet male swimmers
Male medley swimmers
Male butterfly swimmers
Olympic swimmers of the Soviet Union
Swimmers at the 1988 Summer Olympics
Olympic bronze medalists for the Soviet Union
Place of birth missing (living people)
Olympic bronze medalists in swimming
World Aquatics Championships medalists in swimming
European Aquatics Championships medalists in swimming
Medalists at the 1988 Summer Olympics